Piñales is a barrio in the municipality of Añasco, Puerto Rico. Its population in 2010 was 2,875.

History
Puerto Rico was ceded by Spain in the aftermath of the Spanish–American War under the terms of the Treaty of Paris of 1898 and became an unincorporated territory of the United States. In 1899, the United States Department of War conducted a census of Puerto Rico finding that the population of Piñales barrio was 1,038.

Piñales barrio became inaccessible when Hurricane Maria hit Puerto Rico on September 20, 2017 and caused landslides and destruction. Five months after the hurricane struck, engineers and officials were grappling with the massive amounts of repairs that were needed to PR-109 in Añasco and multiple other areas of this barrio and of Añasco, as a whole.

Sectors
Barrios (which are like minor civil divisions) in turn are further subdivided into smaller local populated place areas/units called sectores (sectors in English). The types of sectores may vary, from normally sector to urbanización to reparto to barriada to residencial, among others.

The following sectors are in Piñales barrio:

See also

 List of communities in Puerto Rico
 List of barrios and sectors of Añasco, Puerto Rico

References

External links

Barrios of Añasco, Puerto Rico